Thiohalospira is an obligately chemolithoautotrophic genus of bacteria from the family of Ectothiorhodospiraceae.

References

Chromatiales
Bacteria genera
Taxa described in 2008